Olney Creek is a stream in the U.S. state of Washington, in Snohomish County.

Olney Creek bears the name of an early settler.

See also
List of rivers of Washington

References

Rivers of Snohomish County, Washington
Rivers of Washington (state)